Rustem Ilshatovich Khaliullin (born 15 February 1987) is a Russian former professional football player.

Club career
He participated in the 2010–11 Russian Cup run for FC Gornyak Uchaly that saw the third-division team knock out one of the top Russian teams, FC Lokomotiv Moscow and advance to the Round 16. In that round, they faced another Russian Premier League team FC Alania Vladikavkaz, the game went to penalty shootout, in which Khaliullin was the only one to miss his shot and Alania went through.

He made his Russian Football National League debut for FC Sibir Novosibirsk on 15 May 2011 in a game against FC Luch-Energiya Vladivostok.

External links
 

1987 births
People from Naberezhnye Chelny
Living people
Russian footballers
Association football defenders
FC Sibir Novosibirsk players
FC Gornyak Uchaly players
FC Baltika Kaliningrad players
FC Saturn Ramenskoye players
FC SKA Rostov-on-Don players
FC Dynamo Stavropol players
FC KAMAZ Naberezhnye Chelny players
FC Khimik Dzerzhinsk players
Sportspeople from Tatarstan